The 1970 Memorial Park riot was a civil disturbance by alienated white youths that began in Royal Oak, Michigan, on August 24, 1970, and spread to Birmingham, Michigan, both primarily white middle class suburbs of Detroit. The initial conflict resulted from the closure by police of Memorial Park in Royal Oak. Authorities said that the park was being used as a marketplace for the sale of illegal drugs. The riot lasted for three days, and led to the formation of several youth controlled social service organizations.

Background

Memorial Park had become a gathering place for members of the counterculture and radical youths in previous years. In the summer of 1969, a radical youth group called Youth for Peace, Freedom and Justice began holding communal suppers in the park, and also obtained a permit for free film showings in the park, including radical films from the Newsreel Film Collective.

On May 6, 1970, an antiwar demonstration was held at the park that culminated in a march to the local draft board office. A "fist-swinging melee" between police and 100 youths ensued. Five youths were arrested, and a policeman and three protesters were injured.

By the summer of 1970, Memorial Park was well known as a gathering place for alienated youths and street people who often called themselves "freaks". Drug sales, drug use and large parties were commonplace in the park.

Officials stated that the youths had a "protective attitude" toward the park and claimed the right to "do their own thing". Fifteen "hippie-garbed" undercover police officers infiltrated the drug scene at the park, documenting illegal drug sales.

Closure of Memorial Park and first night of rioting

On the evening of Monday, August 24, 1970, the Royal Oak Police Department closed Memorial Park and ordered the people in the park to disperse. Some of the police officers were "firing revolvers in the air" when they entered the park.

In response to the park's closure, 800 youths began a four-hour battle with the police that included throwing bottles and rocks, smashing windows, and erecting tire barricades on Woodward Avenue, one of the main traffic arteries in the Detroit metropolitan area.

Mrs. Ralph Akens, a woman living adjacent to the park, asked, "How would you like 500 trashy hippies across the street from you?", and supported an indefinite closure of the park.

It didn't work with everybody, as a police car was vandalized by angry teenagers that night, just outside of Elmwood Park.

Second night of rioting

On Tuesday night, the rioting spread north and south along Woodward Avenue. Royal Oak officials imposed a curfew lasting from 7:00 p.m. to 5:00 a.m. By the end of the second night of rioting, approximately 100 youths had been arrested.

Third night of rioting

Because of the curfew imposed in Royal Oak, a crowd of 1000 angry youth gathered on Wednesday night in Birmingham to the north, at that city's border with Royal Oak. There, they confronted a large number of Royal Oak policemen at the city limits, and fighting ensued. In response, the city of Birmingham also imposed a curfew on Wednesday night, due to "rioting, disturbances and destruction of property". The "tight curfews" were successful in reducing the violence, along with mass arrests of all suspicious youths on the streets. City officials considered asking for assistance from the National Guard if the curfews arrests were not effective in ending the rioting, but that was not necessary.
 
It was estimated that up to 2000 youths had participated in the rioting, and at least 564 were arrested.

Most of the injuries were minor. One police officer suffered a possible broken shoulder due to a thrown rock, and another was cut by flying glass when windows on both sides of his squad car were broken by rocks.

Fourth day developments and curfew arrests

On Thursday, August 27, a newly formed youth group called the People's Defense Committee called a press conference at the Record House in Ferndale, Michigan, to discuss a legal response to the arrests. An organization called Birmingham Youth Assistance also called for a meeting of concerned youth. A group of seven "self-appointed" youth leaders had a meeting with Royal Oak city officials.

Although no violence occurred on Thursday night, there were about 90 arrests for curfew violations. The curfews were lifted later that night because the violence had ended.

Young Peoples Coalition and Center House

In the aftermath of the riots, an organization called the Young People's Coalition was formed and controlled by the disaffected youth, with the assistance of the Family Service Agency of Oakland County, Michigan. The People's Defense Committee entered this coalition, with support from employees of a local business called the Record House, which sold rock and roll music. The coalition's goal was to "relate to the street people who are involved with the drug abuse problem", and the group recognized that the issues had a political basis.

The coalition planned a "drop-in center" and "rap line", and announced a fundraising drive with an initial goal of $1,400.00. One organizer, 17-year-old Pamela Applin, said, "I'd like to see people communicate at a higher level than throwing rocks and arguing." Another organizer, 18-year-old Denny Bastin, said that "We'd like people to talk about what's really inside them." They spoke out against gender discrimination in the schools, said Bastin, and the tendency of society to discriminate against disaffected youth for their "beliefs, looks and actions", said Applin, who urged that the youth be judged as individuals rather than as a whole.

The rap line operation was under operation in Ferndale in 1971 under the name "Center House". Young People's Coalition organizer Jim Heaphy said, "We get calls on drug abuse, general rap problems, parents, jobs, suicides, draft and legal information, all kinds of different things. We refer a lot of callers to other agencies." The Young People's Coalition also operated a drop-in center at the YMCA in Royal Oak, a coffee house in the YWCA in Ecorse, Michigan, and an anonymous drug analysis program. A free clinic at Center House opened in July, 1971. Financial support was provided by local businesses serving the counterculture, including the Record House, the Speakeasy Boutique, The Happy Apple, the Unisex Shop and the Waterbed Store.

1971 baseball bust

On Sunday, April 25, 1971, youths attempted to re-open access to the park by holding a baseball game there. Five police squad cars and a paddy wagon responded, and arrested 21 youths. The People's Defense Committee promptly mobilized lawyers and bail bondsmen to provide assistance to those arrested. A demonstration of 100 youths was held outside the Royal Oak police station, but the police announced their intention to continue arresting youths who gathered at the park.

See also
List of incidents of civil unrest in the United States

External links
 Wayne State University Digital Collections: Photo of rioting youths
 Labadie Collection, University of Michigan, photo of Royal Oak Youth Riot

References

Riots and civil disorder in Michigan
Oakland County, Michigan
Royal Oak, Michigan